Midnapore Medical College and Hospital is a full-fledged tertiary referral Government Medical college. It was established in the year 2004. The college imparts the degree Bachelor of Medicine and Surgery (MBBS) as well as specialised and post-doctoral degrees. Nursing and para-medical courses are also offered. The college is affiliated to West Bengal University of Health Sciences and is recognised by the National Medical Commission. The hospital associated with the college is one of the largest hospitals in the Midnapore district. The selection to the college is done on the basis of merit through National Eligibility and Entrance Test. Yearly undergraduate student intake is 200 from the year 2019.

History
Midnapore Medical College was established by the West Bengal state government in the year 2004. Earlier the college was known as Midnapore Sadar Hospital and offered only medical services. Later, the West Bengal state government upgraded this hospital into a medical college to provide medical education to the younger generation. With enormous efforts of the West Bengal government, doctors, and medical officers of the Midnapore Sadar Hospital and common people of Midnapore, the first batch of medical students was admitted to this college in the year 2004.

Courses
Midnapore Medical College, West Bengal undertakes education and training of students in MBBS & post graduate courses. Currently, the college has permission to grant post graduate degrees in 9 clinical & non-clinical disciplines. The number of PG courses as well as student per course will be increased in subsequent years with the permission of MCI. Total seats in MD Anaesthesiology are 8, MD Medicine are 15, MS Obstetrics and Gynaecology are 12, MD Pediatrics are 7, MS ENT are 4, MS Surgery are 14, MS Ophthalmology are 2, MD Pharmacology 2, MD FSM 2.

See also

References

External links 
 Official Website

Medical colleges in West Bengal
Universities and colleges in Paschim Medinipur district
Affiliates of West Bengal University of Health Sciences
Educational institutions established in 2004
2004 establishments in West Bengal